Hamilton Creek is a rural locality in the Rockhampton Region, Queensland, Australia.

Geography 
The Burnett Highway runs through from north to south.

History 
Hamilton Creek Provisional School opened on 16 November 1908. On 1 January 1909, it became Hamilton Creek State School. It closed in 1972. It was at 50536 Burnett Highway (opposite Golf Links Road).

Education 
There are no schools in Hamilton Creek. The nearest government primary and secondary schools are Mount Morgan State School and Mount Morgan State High School, both in Mount Morgan to the north.

References 

Suburbs of Rockhampton Region
Localities in Queensland